Prunus brachystachya is a species of Prunus native to Papua New Guinea and Queensland, Australia, where it is called the Claudie almond. It prefers to grow in rainforests and the banks of rivers, from sea level up to about 450m. It is a tree with gray to brown bark, usually about 15m but reaching 26m. Its flowers are borne on a raceme and its hairy petals can be white or pale green. Its sepals are hairy as well. Its juicy fruit are red to black, and relished by cassowaries.

References

brachystachya
Flora of Papua New Guinea
Flora of Australia
Plants described in 1965